The Tāngarākau River is a river of the Manawatū-Whanganui region of New Zealand's North Island.
State Highway 43, known as the Forgotten World Highway, travels through the Tāngarākau Gorge.

Bridges

As the river flows mainly through remote areas there are only five bridges across the river along its entire length.
In the upper reaches in the Waitaanga Forest there is a swing bridge on the Tatu Track
State Highway 43 crosses the river three times as it winds through Tāngarākau Gorge
A rail bridge on the Stratford–Okahukura Line crosses the river at the small settlement of Tāngarākau

See also
List of rivers of New Zealand

References

Rivers of Taranaki
Rivers of Manawatū-Whanganui
Rivers of New Zealand